Gabi Lasri (born October 5, 1956) is former Israeli footballer known as the first one to move from Hapoel Tel Aviv to Maccabi Tel Aviv.

References

1956 births
Living people
Israeli footballers
Israel international footballers
Hapoel Tel Aviv F.C. players
Maccabi Tel Aviv F.C. players
Maccabi Netanya F.C. players
Hapoel Petah Tikva F.C. players
Hapoel Tiberias F.C. players
Liga Leumit players
Footballers from Jaffa
Association football defenders